Mihajlo Dimitrijević (27 May 1927 – 2 November 1995) was a Serbian high jumper who competed for SFR Yugoslavia in the 1952 Summer Olympics.

He was a member of AK Partizan Belgrade.

References
 at Sports-Reference.com

1927 births
1995 deaths
Serbian male high jumpers
Olympic athletes of Yugoslavia
Athletes (track and field) at the 1952 Summer Olympics
Yugoslav male high jumpers
Mediterranean Games bronze medalists for Yugoslavia
Athletes (track and field) at the 1951 Mediterranean Games
Mediterranean Games medalists in athletics